Alexander Young Andersen (born 25 February 2000) is a Danish cross-country cyclist.

He competed at the 2018 UCI Mountain Bike World Championships, winning a medal.

Major results
2017
 3rd  Team relay, UCI World Championships
 2nd  Team relay, UEC European Championships
2019
 3rd  Team relay, UCI World Championships
 3rd  Team relay, UEC European Championships
2020
 3rd Cross-country, National Championships

References

External links

2000 births
Living people
Danish male cyclists
Cyclists at the 2018 Summer Youth Olympics